Lewis Army Museum (originally Fort Lewis Military Museum) is a military museum at Joint Base Lewis–McChord in the state of Washington, U.S. It is housed in the historic former Red Shield Inn, which is listed on the National Register of Historic Places (NRHP) and can be seen prominently from Interstate 5. It is the only certified U.S. Army museum on the West Coast.

History
Established in 1971, the museum was originally housed in a two-story barracks. In July 1973, it was moved to the old Fort Lewis Inn.

Exhibits
The current director is Erik Flint. The museum was reopened in 2012 after a two-year renovation. The museum closed on July 2, 2016, and reopened on August 31, 2017, after renovations of the interior exhibits to include dioramas and interactive features.

Red Shield Inn
The Red Shield Inn is one of two surviving Fort Lewis buildings that date back to the World War I era, when the present Fort Lewis was "Camp Lewis". It is the only remaining structure from a onetime recreational area that was called Greene Park.
The building, in Western Stick–style, was built in 1918 by Pratt & Watson Construction Co. of Spokane, Washington, for the Salvation Army, at a cost of $107,000. It was named the Red Shield Inn, based on the Salvation Army symbol. The Salvation Army sold it to the U.S. Army on July 21, 1921, for the nominal price of one dollar. It was briefly known as the Camp Lewis Apartments, then the Camp Lewis Inn, and from 1927 the Fort Lewis Inn. In August 1972, after the new Fort Lewis Lodge opened near the Main Post Headquarters, the building was preserved to become the new home for the fort's museum. The inn officially became the Fort Lewis Military Museum on July 18, 1973. It gained its NRHP listing in February 1979.

Gallery

References

External links

 Lewis Army Museum  webpage. Joint Base Lewis-McChord official website
 The Story of the Red Shield Inn . Lewis Army Museum webpage. Joint Base Lewis-McChord official website
 The Friends of the Fort Lewis Military Museum website

Government buildings completed in 1918
Religious buildings and structures completed in 1918
United States Army museums
Military and war museums in Washington (state)
Military facilities on the National Register of Historic Places in Washington (state)
Salvation Army buildings
Defunct hotels in Washington (state)
Museums in Pierce County, Washington
Museums established in 1971
National Register of Historic Places in Pierce County, Washington
Joint Base Lewis–McChord